Babar: King of the Elephants is a 1999 traditionally animated film directed by Raymond Jafelice and made by Nelvana Limited, Home Made Movies, and TMO-Loonland, in association with The Clifford Ross Company. The film was released in theaters in Canada by Alliance Communications and in the US by HBO Home Video. It is the second film based on Jean de Brunhoff's original book series, following Babar: The Movie. The story chronicles the events of the first four Babar books.

Plot

The film opens with various birds singing "The Ancient Song of the Elephants". Marabou, a marabou stork, states that the elephants have long forgotten the meaning behind the words of the song over the years; the birds remember as they have been around for the same period of time as the elephants. Marabou introduces the story that is about to unfold, beginning with a historically significant event: the birth of Babar the elephant.

In the Great Forest, Babar lives a happy childhood being cared for by his loving mother and playing with the other young elephants, including his friends Arthur and Celeste. One day while walking alone with Babar, Babar's mother is shot and killed by a poacher, and Babar is forced to flee as the poacher approaches; after days of wandering, he eventually finds his way to an unnamed city in Paris. Babar spends an eventful day exploring the city and engaging in human activities such as eating ice cream for the first time and attempting to order at a restaurant, all the while disturbing traffic and frightening the other citizens. He meets an older woman, Madame, who provides him with money to purchase proper clothing at a nearby store. Following an extensive fitting session, Babar emerges from the store wearing his signature bright green suit, red bow tie, and a bowler hat. Madame invites Babar to live with her, and she raises him as if he is human, educating him on subjects including mathematics, etiquette, and how to drive a car on the roads. Although Babar enjoys his new life, he occasionally thinks back to his childhood in the Great Forest, missing his elephant friends and his deceased mother.

Two years later, while on a walk with Madame, Babar is shocked to discover Arthur and Celeste, who have left the Great Forest in search of him. The three friends spend the day in a fashion reminiscent of Babar's first day in the city, but they are interrupted by Celeste's mother and another adult elephant from the Great Forest, who have been searching for the runaway children; though at first angry at their disappearance, the older elephants are ecstatic to see Babar, whom they had presumed dead. They inform him that the King of the Elephants has died from accidentally eating poisonous mushrooms, leaving the elephants in disarray, and that the rhinoceroses have waged war against the elephants due to Arthur and the other younger elephants playing pranks on them. That evening, Madame and Babar agree that it is time for him to return home.

Babar is welcomed back to the Great Forest, where he reunites with his old friend Cornelius and the rest of the elephants. Meanwhile, Lord Rataxes, the leader of the rhinoceroses, mobilizes his forces in preparation for war against the elephants. Babar devises a plan to stop the war: he paints monster faces on the backsides of elephants and has them walk backwards in their approach towards the enemy. The plan succeeds in forcing the rhinoceros troops to retreat in fear, and Babar then has Arthur apologize to the abandoned Rataxes for offending the rhinoceroses, thus restoring peace to the jungle. For his brilliant idea and bravery, Babar is asked to be the new King of the Elephants; he agrees on the condition that Celeste be his Queen, which she accepts.

As King, Babar is keen to introduce Western civilization to the elephants by building a City of the Elephants. He brings in Madame - along with loads of supplies on the backs of camels - to the Great Forest, and together with the rest of the elephants they build huts with thatched roofs for residences, as well as other common city buildings such as a hospital, a theatre, and a courthouse. As they are establishing roles for all of the animal citizens within their new city, Celeste reveals to Babar that she is pregnant; she later gives birth to triplets Flora, Pom, and Alexander. Problems eventually begin to arise in the City of the Elephants, including Madame being bitten by a snake while protecting Zephir and Cornelius being struck unconscious by a fallen beam when his hut catches fire. In hopes of distracting Babar from these events, Celeste plans a picnic for the family, Arthur, and Zephir; her efforts are successful until an unsupervised Alexander stows away in a basket that drifts away in the lake, almost eaten by a crocodile and nearly drowning before he is saved by his parents. That night, Babar's troubles manifest in a nightmare in which he is threatened by a visit from the demon Misfortune and rescued by elephant angels, but he is awoken by Flora the next morning to discover that both Cornelius and Madame are well on their way to recovering from their respective ordeals. The elephants rejoice in the completion of their beautiful new city, for which Babar proposes a new name: Celesteville, named after Celeste.

Voice cast

Soundtrack
The film features five main songs.

The songs are (in order of appearance):

 "Find Your Way" - performed by Lis Soderberg.
 "Take Good Care of Me" - performed by Elizabeth Hanna, Dan Lett, and Kristin Fairlie.
 "Rataxes" - performed by Tom Thorney, Tim Thorney, and Carl Lenox.
 "Joy, Joy, Joy" - performed by Rachel Oldfield.
 "Scary Song" - performed by Tom Thorney, Tim Thorney, Carl Lenox, Lis Soderberg, Rachel Oldfield, Cassandra Vasik, and Emilie-Claire Barlow.

Reception

Critical response 
On Rotten Tomatoes the film has 2 reviews listed, both positive.

References

External links

 
 

1999 films
1999 animated films
1999 fantasy films
1999 independent films
1990s French animated films
French animated films
Canadian animated feature films
Canadian independent films
English-language Canadian films
English-language French films
English-language German films
French children's films
Canadian children's animated films
Animated films about elephants
Films set in Africa
Films set in Paris
Animated films about orphans
Animated films based on children's books
Films based on French novels
Canadian fantasy films
French fantasy films
Nelvana films
Canadian animated fantasy films
French animated fantasy films
German animated fantasy films
German animated films
Alliance Atlantis films
Babar the Elephant
1990s Canadian films
1990s French films
1990s German films